Madge Bellamy (born Margaret Derden Philpott; June 30, 1899 – January 24, 1990) was an American stage and film actress. She was a popular leading lady in the 1920s and early 1930s. Her career declined in the sound era and ended following a romantic scandal in the 1940s.

Early life
Margaret Derden Philpott was born in Hillsboro, Texas on June 30, 1899 to William Bledsoe and Annie Margaret Derden Philpott. Bellamy was raised in San Antonio, Texas until she was 6 years old, and the family later moved to Brownwood, Texas, where her father worked as an English professor at Texas A&M University.

As a child, she took dancing lessons and soon began to aspire to become a stage performer. She made her stage debut dancing in a local production of Aida, at the age of 9.

The Philpotts later moved to Denver, Colorado. Madge met and married Carlos Bellamy in Colorado, but they divorced when she decided to leave Colorado to pursue her acting career. In her autobiography, she later claimed that her agent suggested the name, possibly to avoid the scandal of divorce.

Career

Early years
Shortly before she was to graduate from high school, Bellamy left home for New York City. She soon began working as a dancer on Broadway. After appearing in the chorus of The Love Mill (1917), she decided to try acting. In 1918, she appeared in a touring production of Pollyanna for which she received good reviews. Her big break came 1919 when she replaced Helen Hayes in the Broadway production of Dear Brutus opposite William Gillette, in 1918. Bellamy also appeared in the touring production of Dear Brutus. While appearing in Dear Brutus, Bellamy was cast in a supporting role in her first film The Riddle: Woman (1920), starring Geraldine Farrar.

After the tour of Dear Brutus ended, she joined a stock company in Washington D.C. where she appeared in Peg o' My Heart. While a member of the company, Bellamy shot a screen test for director Thomas H. Ince. In November 1920, she signed a three-year contract with Ince's newly formed Triangle Film Corporation. Her first film for Triangle was 1921's The Cup of Life, starring Hobart Bosworth.

Films

Bellamy's breakout role was as the title character in the 1922 film adaptation of the 1869 novel Lorna Doone. She thereafter became known as "the exquisite Madge" (Artist Penrhyn Stanlaws later called her "The Most Beautiful Girl in America"), and was cast in several melodramas by Ince. In 1924, Bellamy's contract with Ince ended and she signed with Fox Film Corporation where she would stay for the next five years. While at Fox, she appeared in two films for John Ford, The Iron Horse (1924) and Lightnin'. By 1925, Bellamy began encountering difficulties due to several "artistic differences" she had with studio executives. That year, she refused to accept a role in the highly successful silent epic Ben-Hur. She later attributed her career decline due to her own choice of wanting to appear in light comedy and flapper roles that showcased her looks instead of more demanding roles.

In 1927, Fox executive Winfield Sheehan, with whom Bellamy was having an affair, attempted to cast her in the lead role of "Diane" in the romantic drama 7th Heaven. Bellamy later told author Anthony Slide that she was in fact cast as "Diane", but was replaced by Janet Gaynor (who won the first Academy Award for Best Actress for her work in the film) when she was in France shooting exterior shots. Bellamy instead appeared in romantic comedy Very Confidential, in which she appeared as a model who impersonates a famous female sports figure. In 1928, Bellamy was cast in Fox's first part-talking film, Mother Knows Best The film was an adaptation of Edna Ferber's novel of the same name and features Bellamy as Sally Quail, a stage performer whose life is dominated by her overbearing stage mother "Ma Quail" (Louise Dresser). In the musical sequences, Bellamy impersonated several popular performers of the day including Anna Held, Sir Harry Lauder, and Al Jolson singing "My Mammy" in blackface. Reviews for the film were generally positive with critics noting that Bellamy's voice was weak.

Bellamy's final silent film, Fugitives, was released in 1929. Her first full length, all talking feature Tonight at Twelve, was released later that year. By the time of its release, Bellamy's career had taken a severe downturn due to several ill-advised choices she made in fits of anger (fan magazines of the day called Bellamy "Miss Firecracker" due to her temperament). Despite her poor behavior off-set, she was still a fairly popular performer and was named an "American Beauty" by the Hollywood Association of Foreign Correspondents. In 1929, she walked out on her contract at Fox after refusing to star in the planned film adaptation of The Trial of Mary Dugan, a 1927 hit Broadway play by Bayard Veiller that the studio bought especially for Bellamy (the film was made later that year at Metro-Goldwyn-Mayer starring Norma Shearer). Bellamy later said of her career, "I got too big for my britches. I wanted too much money and when it was not forthcoming, I quit."

Bellamy attempted to find work as a freelance actress but did not work again until 1932 when she began appearing in Poverty Row films. One of her better known roles from this period was in the 1932 film White Zombie, opposite Bela Lugosi and directed by brothers Edward and Victor Hugo Halperin. The film was a moderate success but received mixed reviews while Bellamy's performance was generally panned by critics (In a 1970 letter to Classic Film Collector, Bellamy claimed her performance appeared bad because she had lost her voice due to a cold and was dubbed by another actress. This has since been proven false). She was slated to appear in the Halperin brothers' next film, Supernatural, but Carole Lombard was cast instead.

Career decline and scandal
By the early 1940s, Bellamy's career had virtually ended. She garnered considerable media attention when, on January 20, 1943, she was arrested in San Francisco and charged with assault with a deadly weapon after firing a .32 caliber revolver at her former lover, wealthy lumber executive Albert Stanwood Murphy, three times. Bellamy had been having an affair with Murphy for five years before he ended the relationship in October 1942. After learning that Murphy had married former model June Almy shortly after their breakup, Bellamy traveled to San Francisco to confront him and "... make him suffer somehow."

She later admitted that she waited around Murphy's apartment in the Nob Hill area for four days. She eventually spotted Murphy leaving the Pacific-Union Club on January 20. While Murphy was getting into his car, Bellamy fired three shots at him. She later said, "I wasn't within speaking distance [of Murphy], but he saw me and shouted something I didn't understand. Maybe it was 'don't.' Then I guess I shot at him. He ducked and ran." She fired three times, hitting Murphy's car twice while the third shot missed. Witnesses wrestled the gun out of her hand.

Shortly after the shooting, Bellamy claimed that she did not intend to harm Murphy and that she "... just wanted to see him. He wouldn't see me so I took the little gun with me. [...] I had had the little gun so long I thought it was just a toy." She was also quoted as saying, "I only winged him, which is what I meant to do. Believe me, I'm a crack shot". On February 11, 1943, Bellamy pleaded guilty to the lesser charge of violating a gun law and was given a suspended six-month sentence. She was also sentenced to one year of probation.

In July 1943, Bellamy sued Murphy for divorce in Las Vegas claiming that she and Murphy were married by "mutual consent" in April 1941 and had lived as husband and wife up until Murphy ended the relationship. She charged Murphy with "extreme mental cruelty" and asked for both temporary and permanent alimony. In December 1943, Albert Stanwood Murphy asked that the court dismiss the suit, stating that he and Bellamy "are not now and have never been husband and wife". 
On January 4, 1944, a Nevada court denied Bellamy's divorce suit on the grounds that she and Murphy had never legally been married. One day after Bellamy's divorce case was dismissed, she was awarded a reported six-figure out-of-court settlement from Murphy.

The shooting and divorce filing generated publicity for Bellamy, but effectively ended her already fading career. She made her last screen appearance in Northwestern film Northwest Trail in 1945. She returned to the stage in 1946 in the Los Angeles production of Holiday Lady, after which she retired.

For her contributions to the film industry, Bellamy received a motion pictures star on the Hollywood Walk of Fame in 1960. The star is located at 6517 Hollywood Boulevard.

Personal life
Bellamy was briefly married to bond broker Logan F. Metcalf. They married in Tijuana on January 24, 1928. They separated four days later. Metcalf filed for divorce claiming that while the two were on honeymoon, Bellamy had refused to speak to him because of his fondness for eating ham and eggs, which she considered "plebeian". Metcalf was granted a divorce on April 25, 1928.

By the time Bellamy retired from acting, she had squandered much of her fortune and lost the remaining money during the Depression. In her posthumously published autobiography, A Darling of the Twenties, Bellamy claimed that she lived in "abject poverty" after her retirement. She did, however, have some holdings in real estate and owned a retail shop in which she worked to support herself. In her spare time, she wrote screenplays and novels which were never purchased. In the early 1980s, she sold the retail shop for double the amount she had paid for it and lived in relative financial comfort for the rest of her life.

Bellamy remained out of public view until the 1980s when film historians and silent film fans who had rediscovered her work began requesting interviews. She also began attending screenings of the low budget horror film White Zombie, which was a moderate success upon its initial release and has since become a cult classic.

In her final years, Bellamy lived alone in Ontario, California.

Death
She suffered from chronic heart problems toward the end of her life. On January 10, 1990, she checked into the San Antonio Community Hospital in Upland, California for treatment. She died there of heart failure on January 24 at the age 90. She is buried at Forest Lawn Memorial Park in Glendale, California.

Her autobiography A Darling of the Twenties was published one month after her death.

Filmography

References

Notes

External links

 
 
 
 Literature on Madge Bellamy

1899 births
1990 deaths
20th-century American actresses
Actresses from Denver
Actresses from San Antonio
American autobiographers
American film actresses
American atheists
American musical theatre actresses
American silent film actresses
American stage actresses
Burials at Forest Lawn Memorial Park (Glendale)
People from Hillsboro, Texas
People from Ontario, California
Women autobiographers
20th-century American singers
20th-century American women singers